Sun Qichao (born 13 December 1994) is a Chinese Paralympic sprinter mainly competing in T12 events. He won the silver medal at the Men's 400 metres T12 event at the 2015 IPC Athletics World Championships. He won the gold medal at the Men's 400 metres T12 event at the 2016 Summer Paralympics.

References

Living people
Athletes (track and field) at the 2016 Summer Paralympics
Medalists at the 2016 Summer Paralympics
Paralympic gold medalists for China
Paralympic silver medalists for China
Paralympic athletes of China
Chinese male sprinters
1994 births
Paralympic medalists in athletics (track and field)
21st-century Chinese people